Salute to the Marines is a 1943 World War II propaganda war film drama in Technicolor from MGM, produced by John W. Considine Jr., directed by S. Sylvan Simon, and starring Wallace Beery. The film co-stars Fay Bainter, Reginald Owen, Ray Collins, Keye Luke, and Marilyn Maxwell. Beery's older brother Noah Beery, Sr. also appears in the film, which is set in the Philippines just prior to the beginning of the Pacific War.

Plot
Having been stationed in the Subic Bay Naval Base in the Philippines as a member of the United States Marine Corps, NCO Sgt. Maj. William Bailey (Beery) is retired after having served there for 30 years. This happens several months prior to the Japanese bombing of Pearl Harbor and their laying siege to large areas of the South Pacific.

When the Japanese invade the Philippines, Bailey confronts and strangles a Nazi secret agent, who is now spreading anti-American, pro-Japanese propaganda among the native Filipinos. The spy had posed as a religious pacifist up until a devastating Japanese air bombing attack caused many casualties among the unarmed civilians that Bailey, his wife, and daughter (Maxwell) had been living among.

Bailey then takes command of the local Filipino militia that he had earlier trained just prior to his retirement from the Corps. They fight a series of delaying actions against a Japanese ground invasion force, slowing their attack, while waiting for the U.S. Marine island forces to arrive and counter-attack.

Later, after much fighting, while wearing his one time "dress blues" uniform jacket, Bailey takes out an enemy machine gun emplacement while Marine forces blow up a vital bridge, halting the Japanese ground advance. Sgt. Major Bailey is suddenly killed by an aerial bombing attack shortly after his heroic delaying actions have succeeded. The Japanese eventually go on to capture the Philippines.

Sometime later, at the Marine Corps Recruit Depot in San Diego, CA, Sgt. Major Bailey is posthumously awarded, by his former commander in the Philippines, the corps' highest medal for valor. His daughter, now a Marine sergeant, gratefully accepts the medal for her late father, as the entire base's assembled corps passes in review.

Cast
Wallace Beery as Sgt. Maj. William Bailey
Fay Bainter as Jenny Bailey
Reginald Owen as Henry Caspar
Ray Collins as Col. John Mason
Keye Luke as Flashy Logaz
Marilyn Maxwell as Helen Bailey
William Lundigan as Rufus Cleveland
Donald Curtis as Randall James
Noah Beery, Sr. as Adjutant
Dick Curtis as Cpl. Moseley
Russell Gleason as Pvt. Hanks
Rose Hobart as Mrs. Carson
Hugh Beaumont as Sergeant (uncredited)
Robert Blake as Junior Carson (uncredited)
Jim Davis as Pvt. Saunders (uncredited)
Chester Gan as Japanese Officer

Reception
 
(Review by T.S., New York Times, August 30, 1943)

"That old saurian-countenanced leatherneck, Wallace Beery, is back in uniform and fighting trim in Salute to the Marines, which burst into the Globe on Saturday. We say burst because MGM hasn't spared any ammunition in making Mr. Beery's personal defense of the Philippines a wild, rootin-tootin, bang-up affair, and in Technicolor, too. Many a model set has been demolished, many an extra smeared with scarlet, and many a Japanese blown sky-high before this extravagant yarn is over. Mr. Beery's language, now that the lid is off, is hardly less colorful: "little yellow mustard-colored monkeys" is merely one of his several definitions of our Pacific enemy".

"Briefly, it is a story tailored to Mr. Beery's familiar dimensions. An overgrown bad boy with a gilt-edged heart and a coy way of confessing his numerous sins, Mr. Beery is a bellows-lunged marine sergeant who never won a citation though he would dearly love one. He is a service chauvinist to the core; when anyone so much as breathes a word against the Marines he polishes them off even if its costs him the brig. Finally retired, amid the pacifist inhabitants of the Philippine settlement, the old sergeant calls all the shots on the Japanese game of duplicity and is finally vindicated when the Zeros come. Hollywood hindsight makes unconvincing foresight in the movies. But at any rate, Mr. Beery and some stout Filipinos fight their roaring battle and Mr. Beery, at least, wins".

"It is all Rover Boy drama in the bellowing, homespun fashion that has come to be associated with Mr. Beery, and there are many who like it. But displays of patriotism, no less than acting, can be guilty of the same cheaply theatrical excesses that, in the theatre, are defined as "ham." Mr. Beery's "Salute to the Marines" has many a hectic, as well as embarrassing moment, but he is still fighting a small boy's war".

Home media
Salute to the Marines was released December 15, 2012 on Region 1 DVD by the Warner Archive.

External links

,

1943 films
1940s war films
American World War II propaganda films
Metro-Goldwyn-Mayer films
1940s English-language films
Pacific War films
Films directed by S. Sylvan Simon
Films about the United States Marine Corps
Films scored by Lennie Hayton
Films set in the Philippines